Blake Gibbons (born June 21, 1961) is an American actor best known for his recurring role as Coleman on the long running Daytime television serial General Hospital. He also played "The Dude" (Lyle) in The Summer of George episode of Seinfeld.

Filmography
Supernatural (2013)
Criminal Minds (2013)
The Young and the Restless (2012)
Castle (2010)
Chase (2010)
Modern Family (2010)
 The Mentalist (2009)
Dexter (2008)
Love's Abiding Joy (2006)
You and I (2006)
A.I. Assault (2006)
CSI: Miami (as Rick Miller in 2006)
The O.C. (2006)
Dependency (2005)
The Legend of Butch & Sundance (2004)
Wake (2003)
Hollywood Homicide (2003)
General Hospital (2002–12, 2014)
Charmed (2001)
Any Day Now (2000)
The Pretender (1999)
Seinfeld (1997)
Dr. Quinn, Medicine Woman (1993)
Night Trap (1992)
Baywatch Nights (1992, 1994, 1995, 1996)
’’Baywatch (1991)
Elvis (1990)
Moonstalker (1989)
The Golden Girls (1988)
Murder, She Wrote (1984)

Commercials
Pepsi (2002)
Michelin (2003)
Subaru Outback (2009)
Miracle Whip (2010)
Dr Pepper 10 (2013)
Geico "cheat death" (2017)
AT&T "stay in your lane bro" tattoo artist (2018)

See also
History Of General Hospital
List of General Hospital characters

References

External links

American male soap opera actors
Living people
Year of birth missing (living people)